Huddersfield East was a constituency of the House of Commons of the Parliament of the United Kingdom from 1950 until 1983.

Boundaries
1950–1955: The County Borough of Huddersfield wards of Almondbury, Dalton, Deighton, Fartown, Newsome, North Central, and South Central.

1955–1983: The County Borough of Huddersfield wards of Almondbury, Dalton, Deighton, Fartown, North Central, and South Central, and the Urban District of Kirkburton.

The constituency included Huddersfield itself.

Members of Parliament

Joseph Mallalieu had been Member of Parliament for Huddersfield from 1945 to 1950, when the constituency was abolished. When the Huddersfield constituency was recreated, Barry Sheerman became the new Member of Parliament.

Elections

Elections in the 1950s

Elections in the 1960s

Elections in the 1970s

References 

 

Parliamentary constituencies in Yorkshire and the Humber (historic)
Politics of Huddersfield
Constituencies of the Parliament of the United Kingdom established in 1950
Constituencies of the Parliament of the United Kingdom disestablished in 1983